Burrton Township is a township in Harvey County, Kansas, United States.  As of the 2000 census, its population was 1,143.

History
Burrton Township was named for I. T. Burr, a railroad official.

Geography

References

Further reading

External links
 Harvey County Website
 City-Data.com
 Harvey County Maps: Current, Historic, KDOT

Townships in Harvey County, Kansas
Townships in Kansas